The gymnastics competition at the 2018 Central American and Caribbean Games was held in Barranquilla, Colombia, from 20 July to 2 August 2018 at the Centro Eventos Puerta de Oro.

Medal summary

Artistic

Men's events

Women's events

Rhythmic

Individual

Group

Trampoline

Medal table

References

External links
2018 Central American and Caribbean Games – Artistic
Central American and Caribbean Games – Rhythmic
2018 Central American and Caribbean Games – Trampoline

2018 Central American and Caribbean Games events
Central American and Caribbean Games
2018